WBEJ (1240 AM) is a radio station licensed to Elizabethton, Tennessee, United States, the station serves the Johnson City-Kingsport-Bristol area. The station is currently owned by Cb Radio.

References

External links

Country radio stations in the United States
BEJ